The Bay Colony Railroad  is a shortline railroad operating in Massachusetts.

Formerly operating along most of the south coast region (including all lines on Cape Cod), Bay Colony currently operates only along a roughly six-mile stretch of track between New Bedford and Westport, referred to as the Watuppa branch. In addition to moving freight for its customers, Bay Colony also performs AAR-certified repairs on rolling stock and contract track construction projects for other railroads.  It has a sister railroad, the Seminole Gulf Railway, which is based out of Fort Myers, Florida.

History 
The Bay Colony railroad was chartered on March 31, 1977, with the intent of taking over freight service on former New Haven lines from Conrail, which was planning to abandon service. The lines were purchased by the state government, and Bay Colony took over all freight operations on the lines on June 12, 1982 with a 25-year contract.

The contract for the railroad lines owned by the State of Massachusetts administered by the Executive Office of Transportation (EOT), which included the Cape Cod main expired on December 31, 2007.  It was awarded to a new company, the Massachusetts Coastal Railroad (“Mass Coastal”), which took over on January 1, 2008. At that time the Bay Colony ceased operation on those lines, but continued to maintain operations in other areas of the state, namely the Millis branch (until 2019) and the Watuppa branch.

Former Millis Branch 
Bay Colony continued operations along the Millis Branch, a roughly eight-mile segment of track between Needham Junction and the former Millis station. When the Millis GAF Plant in Millis closed, the Bay Colony Railroad took a new contract from Tresca Bros Cement.  Fly ash cars from Dragon Cement in Maine were delivered periodically, usually in the summer months to a section of track near Island Road in Millis.  Though inactive from February 2019 through 2021, the line resumed providing freight service to Tresca Bros in 2022, with one delivery happening in January and one in June.  Bay Colony holds operating rights in the rest of the segment in the event that other freight rail traffic returns along the span of the segment.  This line interchanges with CSX at Medfield.

Watuppa Branch 
Bay Colony also operates along the Watuppa Branch (also referred to as the North Dartmouth Industrial Track), a roughly six-mile stretch of track in the south coast of the state. The branch diverges from the New Bedford Secondary and passes through the town of Dartmouth before terminating in Westport. Bay Colony operates all freight rail along this line, and interchanges with Mass Coastal in New Bedford.

See also 
 Cape Cod Canal Railroad Bridge

References

External links 

 Company website
 The Bay Colony Rail Trail

Massachusetts railroads
Spin-offs of Conrail